Vulcaniella pontica is a moth of the family Cosmopterigidae that is endemic to Turkey.

Adults are on wing in the beginning of July.

External links
Microlepidoptera of Europe. Volume 5: Momphidae, Batrachedridae, Stathmopodidae, Agonoxenidae, Cosmopterigidae, Chrysopeleiidae

pontica
Moths described in 2003
Endemic fauna of Turkey